Hakim Rais Unani Medical College and Hospital is located in the Sambhal district. It was established in 2010 and teaches the Unani method of medicine.

History and Formation 
Hakim Rais Unani Medical College and Hospital was founded by Hakim Zafar Ahmad Sadiq in 2010 with the great vision of spreading the Unani method of Medicine. The college affiliated from Chhatrapati Shahu Ji Maharaj University, Kanpur (U.P.), but from session 2015–16 college has been affiliated from Mahatma Jyotiba Phule Rohilkhand University, Bareilly (U.P.). The college also recognized by Central Council of Indian Medicine, Ministry of AYUSH, New Delhi.

Aim and Objects of Unani Education 
To produce competent Unani graduates of profound scholarship, having deep basis of Unani with modern scientific knowledge, in accordance with Unani fundamentals with extensive practical training so as to become Unani Physician and Surgeon and research worker fully competent to serve in the medical and health services of the country.

Courses
Currently the college provides Degree in B.U.M.S. (Bachelor of Unani Medicine & Surgery) (In Arabic Kamil-E-Tib-O- Jarahat).

About BUMS 
BUMS (Bachelor of Unani Medicine and Surgery) is an undergraduate degree programme in the field of Unani medicine and surgery. This degree covers the medical knowledge of the Unani system. To pursue and owe this degree is quite enough to become a doctor (Hakim) in the Unani medical field.

See also
Mahatma Gandhi Memorial Post Graduate College
Government Degree College Sambhal

References

Colleges in Uttar Pradesh
Hospitals in Uttar Pradesh
Sambhal district
Unani medicine organisations
2010 establishments in Uttar Pradesh
Educational institutions established in 2010